An Attempt at Exhausting a Place in Paris, (French: Tentative d'épuisement d'un lieu parisien) is a short (roughly 60 pages) book by Georges Perec written in October 1974 and published in 1975. It is a collection of observations which Perec wrote as he sat in Saint-Sulpice Square in Paris. Rather than describing impressive or notable things such as the architecture, Perec aims to describe all the things that usually pass unnoticed. He charts brief details of buses and people who pass, not worrying about repetition. An Attempt at Exhausting a Place in Paris was first published in the French journal Cause Commune in 1975 and as a small book in 1982 (Marc Lowenthal’s English translation was released in 2010).

Reception
HTMLGIANTs Lily Hoang reviewed it favorably stating "Georges Perec is charming, the most charming man I will never meet, and An Attempt is yet another charming example of his charm."

References

External links
Bibliography of secondary writings on Tentative 

Works by Georges Perec
1975 non-fiction books
French books
Books about Paris
Oulipian works